The Diocese of San Isidro is an administrative division of the Roman Catholic Church in Argentina.

Bishops

Ordinaries
Antonio María Aguirre (1957–1985) 
Jorge Casaretto (1985–2011) 
Óscar Vicente Ojea (since 2011)

Coadjutor bishop
Jorge Casaretto (1983–1985)

Auxiliary bishops
Justo Oscar Laguna (1975–1980), appointed Bishop of Morón
Martín Fassi (2014–2020), appointed Bishop of San Martín
Guillermo Eduardo Caride (2018–
Raúl Pizarro, elect (2020–

Other priests of this diocese who became bishops
Carlos María Franzini, appointed Bishop of Rafaela in 2000
Miguel Ángel D’Annibale, appointed Auxiliary Bishop of Río Gallegos in 2011
Jorge Eduardo Scheinig, appointed Auxiliary Bishop of Mercedes-Luján in 2017
Marcelo Fabián Mazzitelli, appointed Auxiliary Bishop of Mendoza in 2017
Jorge Ignacio García Cuerva, appointed Auxiliary Bishop of Lomas de Zamora in 2017

References

San Isidro
San Isidro
San Isidro
San Isidro